Deplanchea bancana is a tree in the family Bignoniaceae. It is named for Sumatra's Bangka Island.

Description
The fissured bark is white to brown. The flowers are yellow and 5-lobed.

Distribution and habitat
Deplanchea bancana grows naturally in Sumatra, Peninsular Malaysia and Borneo. Its habitat is lowland forests from sea-level to  altitude.

References

Bignoniaceae
Trees of Sumatra
Trees of Peninsular Malaysia
Trees of Borneo